Anne Lise Wærness (born 1 September 1951) is a Norwegian high jumper. She was born in Trondheim. She competed at the 1968 Summer Olympics in Mexico City. Her personal best is 1.74m.

References

External links

1951 births
Living people
Sportspeople from Trondheim
Norwegian female high jumpers
Olympic athletes of Norway
Athletes (track and field) at the 1968 Summer Olympics